Veneficoceras is a genus of the rod-bearing Baltoceratidae, an extinct cephalopod family with characteristics of the orthoceratoid Dissidocerida, found in Cassinianage, Lower Ordovician, limestone in western Utah.

Background
Veneficoceras has a large tubular siphuncle with thin connecting rings that lies along the interior ventral margin. The endosiphuncular rod appears in vertical section to bifurcate into a larger ventral rod on the bottom and a smaller and shorter dorsal rod on top. In cross section a complete lining all around would probably appear, with a dorsally offset central opening.

Veneficaceras is named for the witch in the Tajar stories by Jane Shaw Ward. Other genera whose names are based on the same stories are Tajaroceras. Rangeroceras, and Wardoceras

References

 Stephen C. Hook and Rousseau H. Flower 1977. Late Canadian (Zones J, K) Cephalopod Faunas from Southwestern United States. Memoir 32, New Mexico Bureau of Mines and Mineral Resources.

Prehistoric cephalopod genera
Orthocerida